The Scottish national ice hockey team was the national ice hockey team of Scotland. The club last participated in an international game in 1994, a 5–6 loss to England. Scotland players are part of the Great Britain national ice hockey team.

References

External links
Official Site

 
Former national ice hockey teams
Ice